The Our Lady of the Most Holy Rosary Cathedral  also called Estelí Cathedral is a religious building in the Catholic Church that serves as the seat of the Diocese of Estelí and is dedicated to the Marian devotion of Our Lady of the Rosary, patroness of the Diocese. It is located in the city of Estelí, in the Central American country of Nicaragua. It has a neoclassic and modern style, it was consecrated as the seat of the diocese on December 17, 1962 by Pope John XXIII.

In 1946, being the temple in its first stage, the old image of "Crucified Lord Detachment" was discovered, because of the remodeling of the temple, Christ was deposited in a wooden urn, abandoned in a tank of the main altar. He was known until the 1990s, as the White Cathedral.

See also
Roman Catholicism in Nicaragua
Our Lady of Rosary

References

Roman Catholic cathedrals in Nicaragua
Estelí
Roman Catholic churches completed in 1990
20th-century Roman Catholic church buildings in Nicaragua
Neoclassical architecture in Nicaragua